LaVale is a census-designated place (CDP) in Allegany County, Maryland, United States.  It is part of the Cumberland, MD-WV Metropolitan Statistical Area.  The population was 3,551 at the 2010 census.

Geography
To the east is Cumberland and the very scenic Narrows, a water gap between Haystack Mountain to the south and Wills Mountain to the north. To the west is Piney Mountain and Frostburg. LaVale is on the Old National Pike. LaVale is a business center that contains the largest concentration of retail and the only indoor shopping mall, Country Club Mall, in the Cumberland metro area.

The LaVale Tollgate House was listed on the National Register of Historic Places in 1971.

Demographics

As of the census of 2000, there were 4,613 people, 1,924 households, and 1,377 families residing in the CDP. The racial makeup of the CDP was 97.59% White, 0.65% African American, 0.04% Native American, 1.02% Asian, 0.02% Pacific Islander, 0.13% from other races, and 0.54% from two or more races. Hispanic or Latino of any race were 0.48% of the population.

There were 1,924 households, out of which 26.7% had children under the age of 18 living with them, 61.7% were married couples living together, 7.6% had a female householder with no husband present, and 28.4% were non-families. 25.1% of all households were made up of individuals, and 14.2% had someone living alone who was 65 years of age or older. The average household size was 2.38 and the average family size was 2.82.

In the CDP, the population was spread out, with 20.6% under the age of 18, 7.0% from 18 to 24, 24.3% from 25 to 44, 27.6% from 45 to 64, and 20.6% who were 65 years of age or older. The median age was 44 years. For every 100 females, there were 94.6 males. For every 100 females age 18 and over, there were 89.0 males.

The median income for a household in the CDP was $42,911, and the median income for a family was $48,494. Males had a median income of $33,125 versus $23,179 for females. The per capita income for the CDP was $20,989. About 4.8% of families and 7.3% of the population were below the poverty line, including 4.9% of those under age 18 and 5.1% of those age 65 or over.

Library
The LaVale Public Library is part of the Allegany Country Library System and is the headquarters for the Allegany County Bookmobile. The first public library in LaVale opened on April 18, 1953. The current building opened on September 28, 1975.

Major roads
 Interstate 68
 US Alternate Route 40
 Maryland Route 53
 Maryland Route 49

Schools
LaVale is served by the Allegany County Public Schools  district.
 Parkside Elementary School
 Cash Valley Elementary School
 Braddock Middle School (in Cumberland)
 Allegany High School (in Cumberland)

References

Census-designated places in Allegany County, Maryland